Sophia George (born 21 February 1964, in Kingston, Jamaica) is a Jamaican singer.  She is best known for her 1985 hit "Girlie Girlie", which reached number one in Jamaica, topping the RJR chart for 11 weeks, and was also a Top-10 hit in the UK. Her other Jamaican hits include "Lazy Body", "It Burn Mi Belly", and the duet "Ain't No Meaning"; all four songs appeared on her ten-song 1986 album, Fresh.

"Girlie Girlie" was written by Sangie Davis. At the time of its release, George was working as a teacher of hearing  impaired learners. In the UK, George remains a one-hit wonder based on that song. The track was used as title music on Going Overboard, a movie featuring Adam Sandler. It was covered by Blondie on their 2011 album Panic of Girls.

A compilation album, Girlie Girlie: The Best of Sophia George, was released on Trojan Records.

George married her manager Ronald Chung and in the mid-1990s they relocated to Miami, later settling in Los Angeles. George is the mother of Patrick Chung (born 19 August 1987), a safety for the New England Patriots.

Discography
 Fresh (1986), Winner
 For Everyone (1991), Pow Wow 
 Steppin' Out (1994), Pow Wow
 Girlie Again (1995), Red Arrow
 Sexy Dumb Dumb (1995), Pow Wow 
 Girlie Girlie (2001), Wesgram, Sire/Warner Bros. (USA)

See also
List of performances on Top of the Pops

References

1964 births
Living people
Musicians from Kingston, Jamaica
20th-century Jamaican women singers
Jamaican reggae singers
Sire Records artists